Masunga /ˈmɑːsuŋɡʌ/ is a Bakalanga settlement in the North-East District of Botswana. The village is the Headquarters of the North East District. The Chief of the region is Kgosi Thabo Maruje Masunga III, who took over from his uncle Christopher Masunga.

Near Masunga are the hills of Domboshaba, which hold a ruined outpost of the Kalanga Empire, more like Great Zimbabwe (Mutapa). It is one of the tourist attractions in Botswana where a yearly Ikalanga cultural ceremony takes place.

The language spoken in the North East Region is Kalanga, not Tswana like the rest of Botswana. Kalanga is closely related to Shona, the main language of Zimbabwe.

Activities and attractions in Masunga 
Things to do in Masunga include:
 Near Masunga are the hills of Domboshaba, which hold a ruined output of the Kalanga Empire
 Rock Art.
There is a sports complex that caters for different sporting activities.

Schools in Masunga
Masunga Senior Secondary School

See also

 Mathangwane Village
 Education in Botswana

References

Populated places in Botswana
District capitals in Botswana
North-East District (Botswana)